Payson is a village in Adams County, Illinois, United States. The population was 1,025 at the 2020 census. It is part of the Quincy, IL–MO Micropolitan Statistical Area.

History 
Payson was laid out in the Spring of 1835.

During the 1860 presidential campaign, the residents of Payson erected a pole on which they hung banners supporting the Democratic candidate, Stephen Douglas, and an effigy of Abraham Lincoln riding a rail. This resulted in two confrontations with the Quincy Wide Awakes, the Republican para-military organization, on August 25–26, 1860. During the second confrontation, shots were fired at the Wide Awakes, resulting in injuries. This action was related to the "Stone's Prairie Riot" at nearby Plainville.

Geography

Demographics

As of the 2020 census there were 1,025 people, 444 households, and 360 families residing in the village. The racial makeup of the village was 93.66% White, 0.49% African American, 0.20% Native American, 0.10% Asian, 0.10% from other races, and 5.46% from two or more races. Hispanic or Latino of any race were 1.56% of the population.

There were 444 households, out of which 106.98% had children under the age of 18 living with them, 62.39% were married couples living together, 9.68% had a female householder with no husband present, and 18.92% were non-families. 15.77% of all households were made up of individuals, and 1.58% had someone living alone who was 65 years of age or older. The average household size was 3.44 and the average family size was 3.15.

The village's age distribution consisted of 34.9% under the age of 18, 7.4% from 18 to 24, 29.1% from 25 to 44, 22% from 45 to 64, and 6.6% who were 65 years of age or older. The median age was 27.8 years. For every 100 females, there were 104.7 males. For every 100 females age 18 and over, there were 104.0 males.

The median income for a household in the village was $62,813, and the median income for a family was $66,389. Males had a median income of $37,125 versus $25,278 for females. The per capita income for the village was $24,765. About 5.8% of families and 10.9% of the population were below the poverty line, including 12.7% of those under age 18 and 2.2% of those age 65 or over.

Public education is provided at Payson-Seymour Elementary School and Payson-Seymour High School.

Notable people

 Mary Frances Leach, educator and chemist
Anna Kay Scott, medical missionary in India and China
 Ralph Works, pitcher for the Cincinnati Reds and Detroit Tigers

Registered Historic Places
Fall Creek Stone Arch Bridge

Footnotes

External links
Early history of Payson, Illinois
Payson school district

 
Villages in Adams County, Illinois
Villages in Illinois
Quincy, Illinois micropolitan area
1835 establishments in Illinois